Bondo (Bónt in local dialect) was a comune (municipality) in Trentino in the northern Italian region Trentino-Alto Adige/Südtirol, located about  west of Trento.  It was merged with Breguzzo, Lardaro and Roncone on January 1, 2016, to form a new municipality, Sella Giudicarie.
  

 

Cities and towns in Trentino-Alto Adige/Südtirol
Garda Mountains